The Battle of the Mareth Line or the Battle of Mareth was an attack in the Second World War by the British Eighth Army (General Bernard Montgomery) in Tunisia, against the Mareth Line held by the Italo-German 1st Army (General Giovanni Messe). It was the first big operation by the Eighth Army since the Second Battle of El Alamein  months previously. On 19 March 1943, Operation Pugilist, the first British attack, established a bridgehead but a break-out attempt was defeated by Axis counter-attacks. Pugilist established an alternative route of attack and Operation Supercharge II, an outflanking manoeuvre via the Tebaga Gap was planned. Montgomery reinforced the flanking attack, which from 26 to 31 March, forced the 1st Army to retreat to Wadi Akarit, another  back in Tunisia.

Background

Axis retreat from El Alamein
The retreat of Panzer Army Africa (known as the / from October 1942) took place from 5 November 1942 to 15 February 1943.

Rommel wanted to retreat to Wadi Akarit in the Gabès area,  further west, where the non-motorised troops could defend a narrow gap between the Mediterranean and the Chott Djerid. The tanks and motorised infantry would join the 5th Panzer Army (Colonel-General Hans-Jürgen von Arnim) further north, drive back the British First Army from Tunisia into Algeria, then swiftly return to force back the Eighth Army. At a meeting with Hitler on 28 November, Rommel discussed the proposal but received only a promise of more supplies. On the night of  the British attacked and on the following evening, the  resumed its retreat, and despite its chronic fuel shortage, evaded another outflanking move. The  took up a defensive position at Buerat on 29 December but it was poorly fortified, wide open to an outflanking manoeuvre and vulnerable to an attack on Gabès by the First Army in southern Tunisia. The supply situation was a little better, with  tons of the  required daily, but  of the fuel had been used distributing supplies or in retreat.

The Long Range Desert Group (LRDG) attacked Axis supply lines and hundreds of lorries were stranded along the roads for lack of fuel, while the Eighth Army amassed fuel and ammunition for its next attack. On 13 January 1943, the infantry of the 21st Panzer Division were sent north to the 5th Panzer Army to protect Gabès. On 15 January, the Eighth Army attacked with  against  and  tanks. That evening Rommel ordered another retreat; lack of fuel and apprehension about the threat to Gabès, led the retreating infantry to pass beyond the Tarhuna–Homs line. The British occupied Tripoli on 23 January (the Axis retreat from El Alamein had covered . On 13 February, the last Axis soldiers left Libya and on 15 February, the rearguard reached the Mareth Line,  inside Tunisia.  intended them to hold the line indefinitely but Rommel considered it too vulnerable to another flanking move, unlike the Wadi Akarit position further back.

Terrain
The broken terrain of southern Tunisia, with difficult rocky ridge lines and desert, limited manoeuvre; opposite the bight where the north–south coast opens to the east, a semi-arid, scrub covered coastal plain is met inland by the Matmata Hills which lie south to north. Across the plain in a line roughly south-west to north-east was the Mareth Line, fortifications built by the French in the 1930s. In the north, the hills and the line of forts ended at the Tebaga Gap, a mountain pass between the Matmata Hills and the Djebel Tebaga, another line of high ground to the west of the gap, running east–west. North and west of this feature is the Chott el Djerid and west of the Matmata Hills, dry  country and then the impassable sand of the Grand Erg Oriental. Gabès lies on the coast, where the plain meets the route from the Tebaga Gap. North of Gabès, the road to Sfax passes between the sea and the chotts, was the only route north for the Eighth Army and it was blocked by the Mareth Line.

The wadi crosses the coastal plain from Zarat to Toujane and into the Matmata Hills beyond. In 1938, the French judged  impassable for motorised transport, and so had not extended the Mareth Line any further inland, but in 1943, motor vehicles had much better performance. The British had an advantage because General Georges Catroux, the designer and garrison commander of the Mareth Line in the 1930s, was available in Algiers, to provide information and advice for the attack. In the original plan, Montgomery wrote "...the object of Operation Pugilist is to destroy the enemy now opposing Eighth Army in the Mareth Line and to advance and capture Sfax".

Prelude

Battle of Medenine

The Battle of Medenine (/Operation Capri), was an Axis spoiling attack at Medenine in Tunisia on 6 March 1943. The operation was intended to delay an attack by the British Eighth Army on the Mareth Line. Forewarned by Ultra decrypts of German wireless communications, the British rushed reinforcements from Tripoli and Benghazi before the Axis attack, which was a costly failure. General Erwin Rommel, the commander of Army Group Africa, could not afford to lose men he  needed to defend the Mareth Line, abandoned the effort at dusk. The Eighth Army remained alert overnight in case of another Axis attempt and sent forward patrols to reconnoitre and demolish knocked-out Axis tanks. On 7 March, the Axis forces began to withdraw north towards the Mareth Line. The Eighth Army pursued, slowed by rain. The Battle of Medenine was Rommel’s last action in the North African Campaign. He returned to Europe for good soon afterwards.

Battle

Operation Pugilist

On 19 March 1943, XXX Corps (Lieutenant-General Oliver Leese) commenced Operation Pugilist. The 50th (Northumbrian) Infantry Division (Major-General John Nichols) managed to penetrate the line held by the 136th Armoured Division "Giovani Fascisti" near Zarat. Rain and the nature of the terrain prevented the deployment of tanks, aircraft or anti-tank guns, which left the infantry isolated. A counter-attack by 15th Panzer Division and the "Giovani Fascisti" on 22 March recaptured much of the bridgehead, 35 British tanks and 200 prisoners. British forces held their positions until darkness. On 24 March all the British attacking forces were recalled. XXX Corps prepared a new attack towards Tallouf, in which the 4th Indian Infantry Division (Major-General Francis Tuker) would make a night attack on  around the inland end of the line, coinciding with a wide left hook manoeuvre by Montgomery.

Left hook
In early January 1943, a LRDG patrol had found a pass into the Jebel Dahar, which was given the name Wilder's Gap. A later patrol penetrated to the Tebaga Gap and proved that the route was practicable. The patrol demonstrated the weakness of Axis defences by going further north to Gafsa and on 2 February, made contact with the First Army advancing from the west. Montgomery reinforced the 2nd New Zealand Division (Lieutenant-General Bernard Freyberg) and renamed it the New Zealand Corps, for an attack through the Matmata Hills via Wilder's Gap, into the Jebel Dahar, with the assembly of the force concealed from Axis reconnaissance. Staff from X Corps (Lieutenant-General Brian Horrocks) were seconded to provide adequate HQ personnel for the new New Zealand Corps, too big for one divisional staff, which caused some friction between the two generals.

The corps would then advance to El Hamma, which overlooks the coast road north of Gabès. The flank of the advance was to be protected by Free French forces (General Philippe Leclerc) and the 1st King's Dragoon Guards. An attack by X Corps from Al-Hamma to Gabès would cut off the 1st Army defenders of the Mareth positions and give the New Zealand Corps the opportunity to advance  up the coast to Sfax and the landing grounds on the west side of the town.

The planning emphasized surprise and the ability to  Axis positions. The corps had relatively few infantry and relied on its artillery to break Axis troop morale, with air support provided by fighters and bombers. A simultaneous frontal attack by XXX Corps on the Mareth Line would divide enemy attention and hamper an Axis counter-attack; the II US Corps of the First Army would advance through El Guettar to threaten Axis communications and pin down reinforcements from Sfax.

Tebaga Gap
The New Zealand Corps engaged the Axis troops in the Tebaga Gap on 21 March but progress over the next four days against the 164th Light Afrika Division and 21st Panzer Division was very slow, although they did secure the entrance to the gap. On the Mareth Line, XXX Corps made some progress but did not break through. On 23 March, Montgomery ordered the 1st Armoured Division of Major-General Raymond Briggs of X Corps to reinforce the New Zealand Corps from reserve, where it was waiting to exploit the anticipated breakthroughs by either XXX Corps or the New Zealand Corps and Horrocks, with the X Corps Headquarters to take control of operations in the Tebaga Gap.

Operation Supercharge II
The New Zealand Corps was to attack into the Tebaga Gap on a two-brigade front and capture the Axis defences from Djebel Tebaga to Djebel Melab, which would be exploited by the 1st Armoured Division. After assembling during the night and lying in concealed positions all day, the 5th New Zealand Brigade was to attack on the right and the 6th New Zealand Brigade on the left, preceded by the 8th Armoured Brigade and a creeping barrage by the New Zealand and X Corps artillery. The attacking troops were to move to high ground  forward and then to a second objective at a wadi  further on.

RAF heavy bombers would begin harassment of the Axis defenders led by General Messe the night before, with attacks on transport and communications until  Day bombers would then begin low-altitude pattern bombing, to add to Axis disorganisation, followed by relays of fighter-bombers every  for  hours. Spitfires would escort the bombers and fighter-bombers and the remainder of the Northwest African Tactical Air Force (NATAF) would bomb Axis airfields. An RAF forward observation officer was to brief pilots by nominating landmarks, marking targets with red and blue smoke; friendly troops were to use orange smoke and the artillery would fire smoke shells to signal to the aircrews. On 24 March, Arnim doubted that an Eighth Army attack was likely and was more concerned about Maknassy further north. Despite the slow advance in the south, Arnim wanted the 1st Army to withdraw to Wadi Akarit on 25 March but Liebenstein and Messe preferred to counter-attack with the 15th Panzer Division. The threat to Maknassy and the possibility of the II US Corps reaching Gabès and cutting off the 1st Army, meant that they had to retire from Mareth and then from Tebaga.

The attack began with the 8th Armoured Brigade, followed by infantry battalion carriers and then infantry on foot. It appeared that the 164th Light and 21st Panzer divisions had not expected a daylight assault and had been surprised; the setting sun, wind and dust had made observation difficult. The British tanks had been ordered to press on and the infantry also managed a quick pace, arriving on the first objective and then kept going, despite increasing resistance and delays. An armoured regiment pressed on to Wadi Aisoub beyond the second objective, followed by the 23rd New Zealand Battalion. On the left, a minefield covered by anti-tank guns was bypassed on both sides to close up to the second objective, clearing a gap for the 1st Armoured Division, despite many Axis posts holding out in the vicinity.

By dark a gap in the defences had been made; pausing until moonrise at  the 1st Armoured Division advanced through the gap and rapidly moved on El Hamma,  to the north-east, halfway to Gabès on the coast. On the morning of 27 March, the 15th Panzer Division was brought out of reserve to counter-attack the New Zealand Corps on their right flank. By  the attack had been repulsed and the New Zealand Corps advanced into the hills on their right. By the evening of 27 March, German resistance had been broken and the line of communication forward to the 1st Armoured Division secured, the division having been halted by the defences of El Hamma, while the tanks had waited for the moonlight. Freyberg persuaded Horrocks that the New Zealand Corps, en route to El Hamma to link with the 1st Armoured Division, should branch off to the right to avoid the Axis defences at El Hamma and head across the broken ground direct to Gabès.

By 28 March, General Messe gave the order that all Axis forces on the Mareth Line be withdrawn to face X Corps and New Zealand Corps on their right flank but by holding up the 1st Armoured Division at El Hamma, managed to avoid encirclement. On 29 March, the New Zealand Corps took Gabès, which forced a further Axis withdrawal to a new line  to the rear of Gabès at Wadi Akarit, while the 164th Light, 15th Panzer and 21st Panzer divisions fought rearguard actions. El Hamma was evacuated on 29 March, leaving the way open for the 1st Armoured Division to advance northward with the New Zealand Corps on their right.

Aftermath

Casualties

On 31 March, Operation Supercharge II was terminated, having cost the Eighth Army  many from the 50th Northumbrian Infantry Division and a large number of tanks; the New Zealand Corps lost  and  The corps was disbanded and its elements were distributed between X and XXX corps. On 30 March, Montgomery sent the following message to Freyberg,

The 15th Panzer Division had suffered many losses, the 164th Light Afrika Division lost most of its weapons and vehicles. The 80th Infantry Division "La Spezia" suffered losses of nearly 50 per cent and the 16th Infantry Division "Pistoia" was almost annihilated; several Italian divisions were amalgamated. The 1st Army withdrew in good order to Wadi Akarit.

Order of battle

British Eighth Army 

 (General Sir Bernard Montgomery)
XXX Corps (Lieut.-General Oliver Leese)
 50th (Northumbrian) Infantry Division
 51st (Highland) Infantry Division
 4th Indian Infantry Division
 201st Guards Brigade
 23rd Armoured Brigade
New Zealand Corps (Lieut.-General Bernard Freyberg)
 2nd New Zealand Division
 8th Armoured Brigade
 1st King's Dragoon Guards
 64th Medium Regiment, Royal Artillery
 57th Anti-Tank Regiment, Royal Artillery
 One Battery 53rd Light Anti-Aircraft Regiment, Royal Artillery
 Leclerc Force (with the Greek Sacred Squadron)
X Corps (Lieut.-General Brian Horrocks)
 1st Armoured Division
 7th Armoured Division (including 4th Light Armoured Brigade, less King's Dragoon Guards)
 Free French Flying Column

Italian 1st Army 

 (General Giovanni Messe)
XX Army Corps
 German 90th Leichte Afrika Division
 101st Motorised Division "Trieste"
 136th Armoured Division "Giovani Fascisti"

XXI Army Corps
 16th Motorised Division "Pistoia"
 80th Infantry Division "La Spezia"
 German 164th Leichte Afrika Division

Reserve
 German 15th Panzer Division

Tebaga
 Saharan Group

Uncommitted
 German 21st Panzer Division

Gafsa front
 German 10th Panzer Division
 Centauro Group

The German 19th Flak Division, with sixteen  batteries and several  anti-aircraft batteries, was on the coast, the 1st Luftwaffe Brigade, little stronger than a battalion, was behind the "Giovani Fascisti" and the Panzer Grenadier Regiment  watched the main Gabès–Mareth road. These and the 164th Leichte Afrika Division, were the only mobile infantry groups available.

See also

 List of British military equipment of World War II

 List of French military equipment of World War II
 List of German military equipment of World War II
 List of Italian Army equipment in World War II

 Tunisia Campaign
 North African campaign timeline
 List of World War II Battles
 Panzer Army Africa

Notes

Footnotes

References

Further reading

 
  published in

External links

 Northwest Africa, Chapter XXVII, Mareth to Enfidaville

Tunisian campaign
Pugilist
Battles of World War II involving the United Kingdom
Battles of World War II involving New Zealand
Battles of World War II involving Germany
Battles of World War II involving Italy
Battles of World War II involving France
Battles and operations of World War II involving Greece
March 1943 events